Adolf Wilhelm Robert Fleig (28 June 1893 – 23 November 1944) was a French rower. He competed in the men's eight event at the 1920 Summer Olympics. He was killed in action during World War II.

References

External links
 

1893 births
1944 deaths
French male rowers
Olympic rowers of France
Rowers at the 1920 Summer Olympics
French civilians killed in World War II
French Resistance members
Resistance members killed by Nazi Germany